The 8th National Hockey League All-Star Game took place at the Detroit Olympia, home of the Detroit Red Wings, on October 2, 1954. The Red Wings, winner of the 1954 Stanley Cup Finals, played a team of All-Stars, with the game ending in a 2–2 tie.

Game summary

Referee: Bill Chadwick
Linesmen: George Hayes, Doug Young

Notes

Named to the first All-Star team in 1953–54.
Named to the second All-Star team in 1953–54.

Citations

References
 

08th National Hockey League All-Star Game
All-Star Game
1955
Ice hockey competitions in Detroit
October 1954 sports events in the United States
1954 in Detroit
NHL All-Star